Sub modo is Latin for "subject to a modification or qualification". In a contract sub modo, the agreement between the parties may be altered or limited within certain parameters. For example, in a 19th-century United States Supreme Court case, Eldridge v. Trezevant, 160 U.S. 452, a landowner with property adjoining the Mississippi River filed for an injunction to block the State of Louisiana from building a levee through his property. Citing an earlier Louisiana case, Ruch v. New Orleans, 43 La. Ann. 275, the court upheld a lower court's dismissal of the injunction, stating

In other words, in this particular case the court held that there are certain inherent limitations to property ownership.

An agreement sub modo does not just apply to real property. Any agreement, contract, license, privilege, or right can be sub modo.

Generally, the term is considered archaic and somewhat dandified.

Latin legal terminology